Abdoul-Gafar Mamah (born 24 August 1985) is a Togolese footballer who plays for French fifth-tier Championnat National 2 club Ouest Tourangeau as a full back.

International career
Born in Kpalimé, Mamah represented the Togo national football team by the 2002 African Cup of Nations in Mali and 2006 Africa Cup of Nations in Egypt.

Career statistics

International

Statistics accurate as of match played 15 November 2016

Honours
Sheriff Tiraspol
 Moldovan National Division (5): 2005–06, 2006–07, 2007–08, 2008–09, 2009–10
 Moldovan Cup (4): 2005–06, 2007–08, 2008–09, 2009–10
 Moldovan Super Cup (1): 2007

Dacia Chișinău
 Moldovan National Division (1): 2010–11
 Moldovan Super Cup (1): 2011

References

External links
 Profile at Sheriff
 

1985 births
Living people
People from Kpalimé
Togolese footballers
Togolese Muslims
Togolese expatriate footballers
Togo international footballers
2002 African Cup of Nations players
2006 Africa Cup of Nations players
2010 Africa Cup of Nations players
2013 Africa Cup of Nations players
2017 Africa Cup of Nations players
FC Sheriff Tiraspol players
Gomido FC players
FC 105 Libreville players
Moldovan Super Liga players
Russian Premier League players
FC Spartak Vladikavkaz players
FC Dacia Chișinău players
FK Ventspils players
Latvian Higher League players
Association football fullbacks
Expatriate footballers in Gabon
Togolese expatriate sportspeople in Gabon
Expatriate footballers in Moldova
Togolese expatriate sportspeople in Moldova
Expatriate footballers in Russia
Togolese expatriate sportspeople in Russia
Expatriate footballers in Latvia
Togolese expatriate sportspeople in Latvia
21st-century Togolese people